The SEAT Minimó is a concept electric quadricycle which was developed by the Spanish car manufacturer SEAT. It was first announced at the 2019 Mobile World Congress in Barcelona and was first revealed at the Geneva International Motor Show that year, alongside the Volkswagen ID.3-based Cupra Born and Cupra Formentor concept vehicles. 

A production version of the Minimó was scheduled for sale by 2021, which did not occur for unknown reasons. In December 2021, SEAT disclosed that it was considering releasing the vehicle into the carsharing market under the SEAT MÓ brand.

Specifications

The Minimó has a 15 kWh battery with a claimed range of 100 km. The battery pack is designed to be removed and swapped out for a charged unit. The prototype is fitted with Android Auto and Level Four autonomous capability together with 5G connectivity.

References

Minimó
City cars
Quadricycles
Electric city cars
Electric concept cars